Heydari (also Romanized as Ḩeydarī; also known as Heidari Alkali) is a village in Angali Rural District, in the Central District of Bushehr County, Bushehr Province, Iran. At the 2006 census, its population was 88, in 25 families.

References 

Populated places in Bushehr County